Åke Roland Janson (5 September 1939 – 8 October 2019) was a Swedish actor. In 2010 Janson published his memoirs called Nackspärrarnas rike. He was perhaps best known for his role in the Sällskapsresan film. He was born and died in Gothenburg.

Partial filmography

1945: Fram för lilla Märta eller På livets ödesvägar - Tor, Granlund's Younger Son (uncredited)
1954: Dans på rosor - Helge, photographer (uncredited)
1969: Den vilda jakten på likbilen - Algot
1976: Det löser sig (TV Movie) - Sune
1978: Lyftet - Roland Bergström
1980: Sällskapsresan - Gösta Angerud
1980: Jackpot (TV Movie) - Burt
1980: Attentatet
1981: Sista budet - Union Leader
1981: Fem dagar i december (TV Mini-Series) - Journalist
1981: Tuppen - Holger
1982: Dubbelsvindlarna (TV Mini-Series) - Karl Hansson
1982: En flicka på halsen - Felix
1982: Time Out (TV Mini-Series) - Sven Lindgren
1982: Klippet - Kåge
1982: Gräsänklingar - Polis
1982: Albert & Herberts julkalender (TV Series) - Malte 'Mallgrodan' Larsson
1982: Flygande service (TV Mini-Series) - Stryparn
1983: Jacob Smitaren - Jacob Andersson
1983: Nilla (TV Mini-Series) - Janitor (1983)
1983: Profitörerna (TV Mini-Series) - Bilskojaren
1983: Lyckans ost - Bertil
1984: Äntligen!
1986: Gröna gubbar från Y.R. - Finkelstein
1989: Hassel – Offren (TV Movie) - Birger Flink
1989: Jönssonligan på Mallorca - Brorsan
1990: Villan
1990–1991: Storstad (TV Series) - Torsten Eriksson
1991: Tre kärlekar (TV Series) - Staff Sergeant
1992: Ha ett underbart liv - Car cleaner
1993: Fredrikssons fabrik (TV Series) - Herr Svensson
1993: Den gråtande ministern (TV Mini-Series) - Taxichauffören
1994: Läckan (TV Mini-Series) - Jonte
1994: Rederiet (TV Series) - Gösta
1994–1995: Rena rama Rolf (TV Series) - Arne Westin
1995: Du bestämmer (TV Series)
1996: Rusar i hans famn - Karl-Olof
1997: Förmannen som försvann (TV Series)
1997: Sjukan (TV Series) - Policeman
1998: När karusellerna sover (TV Series) - Ronald Brötehög
2002–2006: Hem till byn (TV Series) - Grus-Olle (final appearance)
2003: Ägget (Short) - Morfar
2004: Blåljus (Short) - Roland
2008: Sten för sten
2009: Hemligheten (Documentary) - Himself

Bibliography
Janson, Roland (2010). Nackspärrarnas rike: en tidsresa och scener från psykiatriska kliniken. Göteborg: Lindelöw. Libris.

References

1939 births
2019 deaths
People from Gothenburg
20th-century Swedish male actors
21st-century Swedish male actors